Mohamed Fathallah Gomaa Abdelkader El-Ramal (born 15 June 1993) is an Egyptian professional footballer who plays as a defender for Ghazl El Mahalla.

Career statistics

Club

Notes

References

1993 births
Living people
Egyptian footballers
Association football defenders
Egyptian Premier League players
Ghazl El Mahalla SC players
20th-century Egyptian people
21st-century Egyptian people